Macrobius was an Irish priest in the twelfth century. He was Archdeacon of Dublin, then Bishop of Glendalough.

References

See also
Bishop of Glendalough

Archdeacons of Dublin
Bishops of Glendalough
12th-century Roman Catholic bishops in Ireland